Avarana(आवरण) is a Sanskrit term that translates as 'covering' or 'obstruction'. It is considered to be one of the three defects of the mind that hinder spiritual progression. Avarana is a veil of ignorance that dulls the mind and prevents people from seeing their true/higher self. Without lifting the veil of Avarana, it is not possible to know Atman or Brahman.

Avarana is identified as one of the attributes of Maya in Advaita Vedanta. Adi Sankara mentions in his Viveka Choodamani (verses 115-118) that Avarana is an effect of Tamo Guna.

References

Advaita Vedanta